SM U-2 was a German U-boat built for the Imperial German Navy. Only one of the type, sometimes called German Type U 2 submarine, was built. U-2 was ordered from Kaiserliche Werft of Danzig on 4 March 1906, launched on 18 June 1908, and commissioned into the Imperial German Navy on 18 July 1908. She conducted no war patrols and spent World War I as a training platform.

After Germany's surrender, she was decommissioned on 19 February 1919 and sold for shipbreaking to Stinnes on 3 February 1920.

Citations

References 

Robert C. Stern. Battle Beneath the Waves: U-boats at War, Cassell Military Paperbacks, 2002.

External links
 

Type U 2 submarines
U-boats commissioned in 1908
World War I submarines of Germany
1908 ships
Ships built in Danzig